The Battle of the Valerik River on 11 July 1840 was fought as part of the Russian conquest of the Caucasus. It remains famous because of the poem "Valerik" by Mikhail Lermontov, a participant.

Situation in the eastern Caucasus on the eve of the battle 
An attempt to disarm the population of Chechnya in the spring of 1840 had caused unrest which grew into open rebellion against the Russian authorities. The Caucasus resistance leader, Imam Shamil, took this opportunity to appoint Ahberdila Muhammad as naib (governor) of Lesser Chechnya and call for a general uprising of the Karabulaks, Galashians, the Sunzha and Nadterechny Chechens, Nazrans and Ghalghaï. The Russian authorities felt compelled to organize a military expedition against the rebels. The Russian writer M. Lermontov also participated in the battle.

On 6 July the Galafeyev detachment set out from the Groznaya fortress and began destroying the fields and villages to the south and southwest of the fortress, as the inhabitants fled. The rebels did not resist directly, but engaged in constant harassing actions which afflicted the Russians and caused losses.

The detachment's line of march led toward the village of Achkhoy, the road to which passed through the Chekhinsky Forest and crossed the Valerik River. The rebels apparently anticipated the Russian movement and for three days fortified the banks of the Valerik with abatis and debris. On 11 July the Galafeyev detachment decamped from the village of Gekhi and moved toward the Valerik.

Opposing forces

The Russians

The Chechens
Lermontov, in a letter to Barbara Lopukhin and later in his poem "Valerik", evaluated the strength of the enemy at 6,000 to 7,000 fighters. Given that in the area of Lesser Chechnya under the leadership of Ahberdila Muhammad, there were 5,700 families, and that an unprecedented effort was being made on the part of the rebels; assuming about one fighter from each family, the number 6,000 does not seem too high.

Course of the battle
Passing through the Chekhinsky Forest toward the Valerik, the Russian column stretched along a narrow forest road. The approaches to the river saw the first clash as the rebels fired on the column from the forest undergrowth. The Russian advance guard, however, quickly chased off the enemy and the column's battle order was restored.

Soon a Russian detachment reached the Valerik. The river at this point intersects the road the Russians were using almost perpendicularly, and in normal conditions is easily fordable. The bank on the Russian side is an open beach, but the opposite bank is steep and wooded. On both sides of the road the rebels had cut down trees to create a clear field of fire about the length of a musket shot.

Approaching the river to within canister range, the Russian gunners fired a volley into the thicket on the opposite shore, but no reaction was seen.

The vanguard of the infantry battalions were preparing to cross the river and occupy the forest on both sides of the road, to facilitate the passage of the baggage train and other units. Parts of the main body were deployed in their support. At this point, the rebels began to fire on the Russians from across the river.

The battalions of the Kurinsky Regiment, with combat engineers, rushed forward on both sides of the road and crossed the river, where on the opposite side was a rebel fortified blockhouse of logs, and engaged the enemy in a bayonet fight in the forest thicket. The rebels broke before the onslaught and started to retreat, but many of them, cut off from their own people, ran out of the woods near the river where they came under Russian artillery fire from the opposite bank, which drove them back into the woods.

Separate groups of rebels cut off from the main forces attempted to attack the convoy and the headquarters of General Galafeyev, but were everywhere repulsed. Skirmishes continued for some time in the forest near the abatis, which the rebels defended particularly tenaciously, but by six o'clock the battle began to subside and the engineers, withdrawn from the forest, began to assist the convoy in crossing the Valerik.

Casualties
According to the action report of the Galafeyev detachment, the unit's losses were:
Killed: two officer, 5,910 lower ranks
Wounded: Two staff officers, 15 other officers, 198 lower ranks
Shell-shocked: Four officers, 46 lower ranks
Missing: One officer, seven lower ranks

29 Russian horses were killed and 42 injured.

The rebels left 150 dead on the battlefield. According to the reports of spies, Ahberdila Muhammad was shot in the leg. Lermontov stated in a letter that 600 bodies were left by the rebels.

According to the French ambassador in Tbilisi de La Chapelle, the Tsarist forces lost 1400 soldiers and 45 officers.

Results and implications
After crossing the Valerik, the Galafeyev detachment moved to Achkhoy, meeting no further serious resistance. Some minor clashes and skirmishes continued.

Local residents said that the rebels had been sure that the Russians would not be able to cross the Valerik, so at Achkhoy and other nearby villages the residents did not leave until the Russians actually arrived. Here the Galafeyev detachment was met by troops under Major General Ivan Labyntsev who had been performing similar operations in Eastern Chechnya. On 14 July the Galafeyev detachment returned to Groznaya.

However the reports by the French ambassador de La Chapelle in Tbilisi the losses of the Tsarist forces were much greater than what they admitted. In 2021 several French reports and letters from the 1839-1844's were released. Among them were the letters and reports from the French ambassador De la Chapelle living in Tbilisi, Georgia. According to him the Tsarist forces lost up to 1400 soldiers and 45 officers in the battle at Valerik river. These losses were so great that Galafeyev and the Tsarist forces had to retreat early in haste to the Grozny fortress. De la Chapelle also noted that the Chechens were hardly subdued.

Lermontov's role and poem

Mikhail Lermontov, a lieutenant in the Tenginsky Regiment, showed exemplary valor in the battle. The official battle report stated:

For this, Lermontov was awarded the Order of St. Vladimir Fourth Class, but he never received the award as his name was removed from the final list of recipients by Czar Nicholas I, who harbored a strong dislike for the contumacious poet.

Lermontov's poem "Valerik" was first published (with omissions) in 1843 in the anthology Dawn. Although the poem contains battle scenes both stirring and grisly (which correlate in great detail to the official action report), the poem ultimately views war as a senseless slaughter, and he and the fighters (on both sides) as "beasts" violating the beautiful world of his beloved pristine Caucasus.

Lermontov also made several drawings depicting scenes of the battle.

References

Bibliography

External links
Text of Lermontov's poem Valerik 

History of Ingushetia
Battles involving Ingushetia
Battles involving Chechnya
Battles involving Russia
Conflicts in 1840
Battle of the Valerik River
Caucasian War
Battle of the Valerik River
July 1840 events